A Snitch in Time is a 1950 short subject directed by Edward Bernds starring American slapstick comedy team The Three Stooges (Moe Howard, Larry Fine and Shemp Howard). It is the 128th entry in the series released by Columbia Pictures starring the comedians, who released 190 shorts for the studio between 1934 and 1959.

Plot
The trio, acting as carpenters, own a furniture shop ("Ye Olde Furniture Shoppe: Antiques Made While U Waite") who are staining some furniture they have delivered to Miss Scudder (Jean Willes), an attractive curly-haired brunette who owns a boarding house. While attending to their duties (and nearly destroying the furniture in the process), several new boarders at Miss Scudder's place are actually a trio of crooks who have just robbed a jewelry store. The Stooges are held at gunpoint while Miss Scudder is tied up and gagged in her kitchen while the crooks ransack the house to steal several valuable heirlooms in her possession. The Stooges and Miss Scudder work together and unravel the crooks' plot.

Cast

Credited
 Moe Howard as Moe
 Larry Fine as Larry
 Shemp Howard as Shemp
 Jean Willes as Miss Gladys Scudder

Uncredited
 Henry Kulky as Steve
 John L. Cason as Louie
 John Merton as Jerry Benton
 Fred F. Sears as Radio announcer (voice)
 Unknown actor as Policeman
 Unknown actor as Policeman

Production notes
A Snitch in Time was filmed December 13–16, 1949, the last Stooge film produced in the 1940s. It has been consistently ranked as the most violent Stooge film of the Shemp era. Unlike the Curly-era equivalent They Stooge to Conga, in which all three Stooges receive their fair share of abuse, most of the violence in A Snitch in Time is directed at Moe. In its opening four minutes, Moe gets his nose and buttocks jammed into the blade of a giant table saw, as well as getting wood glue in his eye and stuck on his hands.

David J. Hogan, author of the 2011 book Three Stooges FAQ, commented that "kids of the day—before bicycle helmets, seat belts, and moratoriums on peanut butter—loved this kind of torment. It's still funny today, but you keep waiting for the spray of blood." Hogan adds that a February 2001 post to the website www.threestooges.net commented that "Only Dawn of the Dead gives you more pain for your entertainment dollar".

Although Columbia short subject head/director Jules White was known for the usage of excessive violence in his films, A Snitch in Time was directed by Edward Bernds, who always maintained that the violence was not to be excessive in the films he directed.

The title A Snitch in Time parodies the aphorism "a stitch in time saves nine."

References

External links 
 
 
A Snitch in Time at threestooges.net

1950 films
1950 comedy films
American black-and-white films
Films directed by Edward Bernds
The Three Stooges films
Columbia Pictures short films
American comedy short films
1950s English-language films
1950s American films